SS Star of Oregon (MC hull number 171) was a Liberty ship built by the Oregon Shipbuilding Company of Portland, Oregon, and launched on 27 September 1941, the first of the 472 ships built by the company up to November 1945. The ship was named after the Star of Oregon, the first sailing ship built by American settlers in what is now the state of Oregon.

The ship was operated by the States Steamship Company of Portland, under contract from the War Shipping Administration (WSA).

References

 

1941 ships
Liberty ships
Ships built in Portland, Oregon
Maritime incidents in August 1942
Ships sunk by German submarines in World War II